Magnus Enfeldt (born 25 August 1969) is a Swedish speed skater. He competed in two events at the 1994 Winter Olympics.

References

External links
 

1969 births
Living people
Swedish male speed skaters
Olympic speed skaters of Sweden
Speed skaters at the 1994 Winter Olympics
People from Köping
Sportspeople from Västmanland County
20th-century Swedish people